Caratoola Recreation Park (formerly the Caratoola National Parks Reserve) is a protected area in the Australian state of South Australia located in the locality of Haslam about  north of the town of Haslam and about  north of the town of Streaky Bay.  

The recreation park consists of land in section 53 of the cadastral unit of the Hundred of Haslam.  It is bounded by the Haslam Highway to the east and by Watkinson Road to the south.  In 1980, it was described as "Mallee tea tree associations on coast.'

The land under protection was first proclaimed as the Caratoola National Parks Reserve under the National Parks Act 1966 on 24 April 1969.  On 27 April 1972, the national parks reserve was re-proclaimed under the National Parks and Wildlife Act 1972 as the  Caratoola Recreation Park .

In 1980, it was nominated for inclusion on the interim list of the now-defunct Register of the National Estate, but was withdrawn by the nominator because of its “small size”, “drastically altered natural vegetation” and the “reserve used primarily for community recreation with little or no conservation significance.”

In 2012, it was one of several recreation parks listed for re-classification as a conservation park.

It is classified as an IUCN Category III protected area.

See also
 Protected areas of South Australia

References

External links
Caratoola Recreation Park webpage on protected planet

Recreation Parks of South Australia
Protected areas established in 1969
1969 establishments in Australia
Eyre Peninsula